NA-172 may refer to:

NA-172 (Bahawalpur-III), a constituency of the National Assembly of Pakistan
NA-172 (Dera Ghazi Khan-II), a former constituency of the National Assembly of Pakistan